Lazbuddie Independent School District is a public school district based in the community of Lazbuddie, Texas (USA).  Located in Parmer County, a small portion of the district extends into Castro County.

Lazbuddie ISD has one school Lazbuddie High School that serves students in grades pre-kindergarten through twelve.

Academic achievement
In 2009, the school district was rated "recognized" by the Texas Education Agency.

Special programs

Athletics
Lazbuddie High School plays six-man football.

See also

List of school districts in Texas

References

External links
Lazbuddie ISD

School districts in Parmer County, Texas
School districts in Castro County, Texas